The Tunisia men's national water polo team is the representative for Tunisia in international men's water polo.

Results

Olympic Games

World Championship

World Cup

FINA World League

Mediterranean Games

FINA Development Trophy

Team

Current squad
Roster for the Gżira, 2017 .

Head coach:

Coaches

Notable players

References

Water polo
Men's national water polo teams
National water polo teams in Africa
National water polo teams by country
 
Men's sport in Tunisia